The Dunavăț is a right tributary of the river Berheci in Romania. It discharges into the Berheci in Oncești.

References

Rivers of Romania
Rivers of Bacău County